The 1998 Toshiba Classic was a women's tennis tournament played on outdoor hard courts at the La Costa Resort and Spa in San Diego, California in the United States that was part of Tier II of the 1998 WTA Tour. It was the 20th edition of the tournament and was held from August 3 through August 9, 1998. Second-seeded Lindsay Davenport won the singles title and earned $79,000 first-prize money.

Finals

Singles

 Lindsay Davenport defeated  Mary Pierce 6–3, 6–1
 It was Davenport's 3rd singles title of the year and the 16th of her career.

Doubles

 Lindsay Davenport /  Natasha Zvereva defeated  Alexandra Fusai /  Nathalie Tauziat 6–2, 6–1
 It was Davenport's 7th title of the year and the 38th of her career. It was Zvereva's 4th title of the year and the 77th of her career.

References

External links
 ITF tournament edition details
 Tournament draws

Toshiba Classic
Southern California Open
Toshiba Classic
1998 in American tennis